Wilfred Barks (6 October 1908–1968) was an English professional footballer who played in the Football League for Chesterfield, Mansfield Town and Rochdale.

References

1908 births
1968 deaths
English footballers
Association football forwards
English Football League players
Dinnington Athletic F.C. players
Chesterfield F.C. players
Mansfield Town F.C. players
Mexborough Athletic F.C. players
Denaby United F.C. players
Rochdale A.F.C. players